Symmetrical voice, also known as Austronesian alignment, the Philippine-type voice system or the Austronesian focus system, is a typologically unusual kind of morphosyntactic alignment in which "one argument can be marked as having a special relationship to the verb". This special relationship manifests itself as a voice affix on the verb that corresponds to the syntactic role of a noun within the clause, that is either marked for a particular grammatical case or is found in a privileged structural position within the clause or both.

Symmetrical voice is best known from the languages of the Philippines, but is also found in Taiwan's Formosan languages, as well as in Borneo, Northern Sulawesi, and Madagascar, and has been reconstructed for the ancestral Proto-Austronesian language.

Terminology
The term Austronesian focus was widely used in early literature, but more scholars turn to the term voice recently because of the arguments against the term 'focus'. On the other hand, Starosta argued that neither voice nor focus is correct and that it is a lexical derivation.

Schachter (1987) proposed the word 'trigger', which has seen widespread use. As one source summarized, 'focus' and 'topic' do not mean what they mean in discourse (the essential piece of new information, and what is being talked about, respectively), but rather 'focus' is a kind of agreement, and the 'topic' is a noun phrase that agrees with the focus-marked verb. Thus using those terms for Austronesian/Philippine alignment is "misleading" and "it seems better to refer to this argument expression as the trigger, a term that reflects the fact that the semantic role of the argument in question triggers the choice of a verbal affix."

Studies
A number of studies focused on the typological perspective of Austronesian voice system.

Some explored the semantic or pragmatic properties of Austronesian voice system.

Others contributed to the valence-changing morphology.

Properties

Agreement with the semantic role of the subject 
In languages that exhibit symmetrical voice, the voice affix on the main verb within the clause marks agreement with "the semantic role of the [subject]". 

For example, the Actor Voice affix may agree only with agent nominal phrases. (The asterisk means that the sentence is ungrammatical for the intended meaning.)

 Kapampangan

Tagalog

 

The sentences in (b) are ungrammatical because the patient nominal phrase is marked as the subject, even though the verb bears the Actor Voice infix. The sentences in (c) are ungrammatical because, instead of the agent nominal phrase, the location nominal phrase is marked as the subject.

The patient voice affix may agree only with patient nominal phrases.

Kapampangan

Tagalog

The sentences in (b) are ungrammatical because the agent nominal phrase is marked as the subject, even though the verb bears the patient voice affix. The sentences in (c) are ungrammatical because, instead of the patient nominal phrase, the location nominal phrase is marked as the subject.

The locative voice affix may agree only with location nominal phrases.

Kapampangan

Tagalog

The sentences in (b) are ungrammatical because the agent nominal phrase is marked as the subject, even though the verb bears the locative voice affix. The sentences in (c) are ungrammatical because, instead of the location nominal phrase, the patient nominal phrase is marked as the subject.

Types of semantic roles
Across languages, the most common semantic roles with which the voice affixes may agree are agent, patient, location, instrument, and benefactee. In some languages, the voice affixes may also agree with semantic roles such as theme, goal, reason, and time. The set of semantic roles that may be borne by subjects in each language varies, and some affixes can agree with more than one semantic role.

Promotion direct to subject 
Languages that have symmetrical voice do not have a process that promotes an oblique argument to direct object. Oblique arguments are promoted directly to subject.

Tagalog

In the Tagalog examples above, the goal nominal phrase can either be an indirect object, as in (1), or a subject as in (2). However, it cannot become a direct object, or be marked with indirect case, as in (3). Verb forms, such as "nagpadalhan", which bear both an Actor Voice affix and a non-Actor Voice affix, do not exist in languages that have symmetrical voice.

The Tagalog examples contrast with the examples from Indonesian below. Indonesian is an Austronesian language that does not have symmetrical voice.

Indonesian

In the Indonesian examples, the goal nominal phrase can be the indirect object, as in (4), and the subject, as in (5). However, unlike in Tagalog, which has symmetrical voice, the goal nominal phrase in Indonesian can be a direct object, as in (6). The preposition kepada disappears in the presence of the applicative suffix -i, and the goal nominal phrase moves from sentence-final position to some verb-adjacent position. In addition, they can behave like regular direct objects and undergo processes such as passivisation, as in (5).

Examples

Proto-Austronesian
Asterisks indicate a linguistic reconstruction. The voice affix on the verb appears in red text, while the subject, which the affix selects, appears in underlined bold italics. Four voices have been reconstructed for Proto-Austronesian:  Actor Voice, Patient Voice, Locative Voice and Instrument Voice.

Proto-Austronesian

Modern Austronesian languages
Below are examples of modern Austronesian languages that exhibit symmetrical voice.  These languages are spoken in Taiwan, the Philippines, Malaysia, Indonesia, and Madagascar.

The number of voices differs from language to language.  While the majority sampled have four voices, it is possible to have as few as three voices, and as many as six voices.  

In the examples below, the voice affix on the verb appears in red text, while the subject, which the affix selects, appears in underlined bold italics.

Formosan 
The data below come from Formosan, a geographic grouping of all Austronesian languages that belong outside of Malayo-Polynesian. The Formosan languages are primarily spoken in Taiwan.

Amis 
Amis has four voices: Actor Voice, Patient Voice, Locative Voice, and Instrument Voice.

The direct case marker, which marks the subject in Amis, is ku.

Atayal 
While they both have the same number of voices, the two dialects of Atayal presented below do differ in the shape of the circumstantial voice prefix. In Mayrinax, the circumstantial voice prefix is si-, whereas in Squliq, it is s-.

Mayrinax 
Mayrinax has four voices: Actor Voice, Patient Voice, Locative Voice, and Circumstantial Voice.

The circumstantial Voice prefix selects for benefactee and instrument subjects.

The direct case morpheme in Mayrinax is kuʔ.

Squliq 
Squliq has four voices: Actor Voice, Patient Voice, Locative Voice, and Circumstantial Voice.

The circumstantial voice prefix selects for benefactee and instrument subjects.

The direct case morpheme in Squliq is qu’.

Hla’alua 
Hla’alua has three voices: Actor Voice, Patient Voice and Circumstantial Voice.

The circumstantial voice suffix selects for location and theme subjects.

While bound pronouns have a direct case form, nouns do not bear a special direct case marker for subjects in Hla’alua.

Kanakanavu 
Kanakanavu has four voices: Actor Voice, Patient Voice, Locative Voice, and Instrument Voice.

The direct case morpheme, which optionally marks the subject in Kanakanavu, is sua.

Kavalan 
Kavalan has three voices: Actor Voice, Patient Voice and Circumstantial Voice.

The circumstantial voice prefix selects for instrument and benefactee subjects.

The direct case morpheme, which marks the subject in Kavalan, is ya.

Paiwan 
Paiwan has four voices: Actor Voice, Patient Voice, Locative Voice, and Instrument Voice.

The direct case morpheme, which marks the subject in Paiwan, is a.

Pazeh 
Pazeh, which became extinct in 2010, had four voices: Actor Voice, Patient Voice, Locative Voice, and Instrument Voice.

The direct case morpheme, which marks the subject in Pazeh, is ki.

Puyuma 
Puyuma has four voices: Actor Voice, Patient Voice, Locative Voice, and Circumstantial Voice.

The circumstantial voice suffix selects for benefactee and instrument subjects.

The direct case morpheme, which marks the subject in Puyuma, is na or i.

Seediq 
The two dialects of Seediq presented below each have a different number of voices. The direct case morpheme, which marks the subject in both dialects, is ka.

Tgdaya 
Tgdaya has four voices: Actor Voice, Patient Voice, Locative Voice and Instrument Voice.

Truku 
Truku has three voices: Actor Voice, Goal Voice, and Circumstantial Voice.

The goal voice suffix selects for patient and location subjects. The circumstantial voice prefix selects for benefactee and instrument subjects.

Tsou 
Tsou has four voices: Actor Voice, Patient Voice, Locative Voice, and Benefactive Voice. In addition to the voice morphology on the main verb, auxiliary verbs in Tsou, which are obligatory in the sentence, are also marked for voice. However, auxiliaries only differentiate between Actor Voice and non-Actor Voice (in ).

The direct case morpheme, which marks subjects in Tsou, is ’o.

Batanic
The data below come from the Batanic languages, a subgroup under Malayo-Polynesian. These languages are spoken on the islands found in the Luzon Strait, between Taiwan and the Philippines.

Ivatan
Ivatan has four voices: Actor Voice, Patient Voice, Locative Voice, and Circumstantial Voice.

The circumstantial voice prefix selects for instrument and benefactee subjects.

The direct case morpheme, which marks the subject in Ivatan, is qo.

Yami
Yami has four voices: Actor Voice, Patient Voice, Locative Voice, and Instrument Voice.

The direct case morpheme, which marks subjects in Yami, is si for proper names, and o for common nouns.

Philippine
The data below come from Philippine languages, a subgroup under Malayo-Polynesian, predominantly spoken across the Philippines, with some found on the island of Sulawesi in Indonesia.

Blaan
Blaan has four voices: Actor Voice, Patient Voice, Instrument Voice, and Non-Actor Voice.

The non-Actor Voice affix selects for patient and location subjects, depending on the inherent voice of the verb.

Cebuano
Cebuano has four voices:  Actor Voice, Patient Voice, Circumstantial Voice, and Instrument Voice.

The circumstantial voice suffix selects for location, benefactee and goal subjects.

The direct case morpheme, which marks the subject in Cebuano, is ang or si.

Kalagan
Kalagan has four voices:  Actor Voice, Patient Voice, Instrument Voice, and Circumstantial Voice.

The circumstantial voice suffix selects for benefactee and location subjects.

The direct case morpheme, which marks the subject in Kalagan, is ya.  The direct case form of the first person, singular pronoun is aku, whereas the ergative case form is ku.

Kapampangan
Kapampangan has five voices:  Actor Voice, Patient Voice, Goal Voice, Locative Voice, and Circumstantial Voice.

The circumstantial voice prefix selects for instrument and benefactee subjects.

The direct case morpheme in Kapampangan is ing, which marks singular subjects, and reng, which is for plural subjects.  Non-subject agents are marked with ergative case, ning, while non-subject patients are marked with accusative case, -ng, which is cliticized onto the preceding word.

Limos Kalinga
Limos Kalinga has five voices:  Actor Voice, Patient Voice, Locative Voice, Benefactive Voice and Instrument Voice.

Except for when the subject is the agent, the subject is found directly after the agent in the clause.

Maranao
Maranao has four voices:  Actor Voice, Patient Voice, Circumstantial Voice, and Instrument Voice.

The circumstantial suffix selects for benefactee and location subjects.

The direct case morpheme, which marks the subject in Maranao, is so.

Palawan
Palawan has four voices:  Actor Voice, Patient Voice, Instrument Voice, and Circumstantial Voice.

The circumstantial voice suffix selects for benefactee and location subjects.

Subanen
Subanen has three voices:  Actor Voice, Patient Voice, and Circumstantial Voice.  

The examples below are from Western Subanon, and the direct case morpheme in this language is og.

Tagalog
Tagalog has six voices:  Actor Voice, Patient Voice, Locative Voice, Benefactive Voice, Instrument Voice, and Reason Voice.

The locative voice suffix selects for location and goal subjects.  (In the examples below, the goal subject and the benefactee subject are the same noun phrase.)

The reason voice prefix can only be affixed to certain roots, the majority of which are for emotion verbs (e.g., galit "be angry", sindak "be shocked").  However, verb roots such as matay "die", sakit "get sick", and iyak "cry" may also be marked with the reason voice prefix.

The direct case morpheme, which marks subjects in Tagalog, is ang.  The indirect case morpheme, ng /naŋ/, which is the conflation of the ergative and accusative cases seen in Proto-Malayo-Polynesian, marks non-subject agents and non-subject patients.

Tondano
Tondano has four voices:  Actor Voice, Patient Voice, Locative Voice, and Circumstantial Voice.

The circumstantial Voice selects for instrument, benefactee, and theme subjects.

The subject is found in sentence-initial position, before the verb.

Bornean
The data below come from Bornean languages, a geographic grouping under Malayo-Polynesian, mainly spoken on the island of Borneo, spanning administrative areas of Malaysia and Indonesia.

Bonggi
Bonggi has four voices: Actor Voice, Patient Voice, Instrumental Voice, and Circumstantial Voice.

The circumstantial voice suffix selects for benefactee and goal subjects.

The subject is found in sentence-initial position, before the verb.

Kadazan Dusun
Kadazan Dusun has three voices: Actor Voice, Patient Voice and Benefactive Voice.

The direct case morpheme, which marks the subject in Kadazan Dusun, is i.

Kelabit
Kelabit has three voices: Actor Voice, Patient Voice and Instrument Voice.

Unlike other languages presented here, Kelabit does not use case-marking or word-ordering strategies to indicate the subject of the clause. However, certain syntactic processes, such as relativization, target the subject. Relativizing non-subjects results in ungrammatical sentences.

Kimaragang
Kimaragang has five voices: Actor Voice, Patient Voice, Benefactive Voice, Instrument Voice and Locative Voice.

Only intransitive verbs can be marked with the locative voice suffix, which looks similar to the patient voice suffix.

The direct case marker, which marks the subject in Kimaragang, is it for definite nouns and ot for indefinite nouns.

Timugon Murut
Timugon Murut has five voices: Actor Voice, Patient Voice, Benefactive Voice, Instrument Voice, and Circumstantial Voice.

There is no direct case marker to mark subjects in Timugon Murut. However, non-subject agents are marked with the ergative case marker, du, while non-subject non-agents are marked with the oblique case marker, da.

Barito

The data below represent the Barito languages, and are from a language spoken on Madagascar, off the east coast of Africa. Other languages from Barito are spoken in Indonesia and the Philippines.

Malagasy
Malagasy has three voices: Actor Voice, Patient Voice, and Circumstantial Voice.

The circumstantial voice suffix selects for instrument and benefactee subjects.

Malagasy does not have a direct case marker. However, the subject is found in sentence-final position.

Non-Austronesian examples
Alignment types resembling symmetrical voice have been observed in non-Austronesian languages.

Nilotic
The Nilotic languages are a group of languages spoken in the eastern part of Sub-Saharan Africa.

Dinka
Dinka is a dialect continuum spoken in South Sudan. The two dialects presented below each have a maximum of three voices.

Agar
Andersen (1991) suggests that Agar exhibits symmetrical voice. This language has a maximum of three voices: Actor Voice, Patient Voice, and Circumstantial Voice. The subject is found in sentence-initial position, before the verb. The non-finite form of the verb found in the examples below is yḛ̂ep "cut".

 

However, the number of voice morphemes available in this language is reduced to two when the agent is a full noun (i.e., not a pronoun), such as in the examples below. In (5a), where the subject is a patient, and the agent is not a pronoun, the verb is marked with Circumstantial Voice. Compare to (2) above, in which the agent is pronominal, and the verb is marked with patient voice morpheme, .

Bor
Van Urk (2015) suggests that Bor exhibits symmetrical voice. This language has three voices: Actor Voice, Patient Voice, and Circumstantial Voice.

The subject is found in sentence-initial position, before the verb. The non-finite form of the verb found in the examples below is câam "eat".

Kurmuk
Andersen (2015) suggests that Kurmuk, which is spoken in Sudan, has a construction that resembles symmetrical voice. This language has three voices: Actor Voice, Patient Voice, and Circumstantial Voice.

The subject in the examples below is found in sentence-initial position, before the verb.

Notes

Glosses
Here is a list of the abbreviations used in the glosses: 

{|
| 1 ||   || first person ||   ||   ||  ||   || definite ||   ||   ||  ||   || ligature ||   ||   ||  ||   || realis mood
|-
| 2 ||   || second person ||   ||   ||  ||   || determiner ||   ||   ||  ||   || locative voice ||   ||   ||  ||   || reason voice
|- 
| 3 ||   || third person ||   ||   ||  ||   || direct case ||   ||   ||  ||   || masculine ||   ||   ||  ||   || singular
|-
|  ||   || accusative case ||   ||   ||  ||   || ergative case ||   ||   ||  ||   || non-actor voice ||   ||   ||  ||   || transitive 
|-
|  ||   || animate ||   ||   ||  ||   || feminine ||   ||   ||  ||   || nominalizer ||   ||   ||  ||   || morpheme of unknown semantics
|-
|  ||   || aspect ||   ||   ||  ||   || genitive case ||   ||   ||  ||   || nominative case 
|-
|  ||   || actor voice ||   ||   ||  ||   || goal voice ||   ||   ||  ||   || oblique case
|-
|  ||   || auxiliary verb ||   ||   ||  ||   || inanimate ||   ||   ||  ||   || plural
|- 
|  ||   || benefactive voice ||   ||   ||  ||   || indirect case ||   ||   ||  ||   || preposition
|-
|  ||   || circumstantial voice ||   ||   ||  ||   || indefinite ||   ||   ||  ||   || past tense
|-
|  ||   || declarative ||   ||   ||  ||   || instrument voice ||   ||   ||  ||   || patient voice
|}

Endnotes

References

Abrams, N.  1970.  "Bilaan Morphology".  Papers in Philippine Linguistics No.3 A-24:1-62.
Aldridge, Edith.  2015.  "A Minimalist Approach to the Emergence of Ergativity in Austronesian Languages".  Linguistics Vanguard 1(1):313-326.
Andersen, Torben.  1991.  "Subject and Topic in Dinka".  Studies in Language 15(2):265-294.
Andersen, Torben.  2015.  "Syntacticized topics in Kurmuk:  A ternary voice-like system in Nilotic".  Studies in Language 39(3):508-554. 
Bell, Sarah Johanna.  1976.  Cebuano Subjects in Two Frameworks.  PhD dissertation:  Massachusetts Institute of Technology.

Boutin, Michael E.  2002.  "Nominative and genitive case alternations in Bonggi".  The history and typology of western Austronesian voice systems.  eds.  Fay Wouk and Malcolm Ross, pp 209-239.  Pacific Linguistics 518.  Canberra:  Australian National University.
Cauquelin, Josiane.  1991.  "The Puyuma Language".  Bijdragen tot de Taal-, Land- en Volkenkunde 147(1):17-60.
Estioca, Sharon Joy.  2020.  A Grammar of Western Subanon.  PhD Dissertation:  University of Hawai’i at Mānoa.
Ferreirinho, Naomi.  1993.  Selected Topics in the Grammar of Limos Kalinga, the Philippines.  Pacific Linguistics B-109.  Canberra:  Australian National University.

Huang, Stacy Wan Tin.  2014.  "Tao Voice Affixes:  Derivation or Inflection or Both?".  Argument realisations and related constructions in Austronesian languages: papers from 12-ICAL, Volume 2. eds. I.W. Arka and N.L.K.M. Indrawati, pp 175-195.  Asia-Pacific Linguistics 013 / Studies on Austronesian languages 002.  Canberra:  Australian National University.  
Huang, Huei-ju and Shuanfan Huang.  2007.  "Lexical Perspectives on Voice Constructions in Tsou".  Oceanic Linguistics 46.2:424-455.
Kroeger, Paul R.  2005.  "Kimaragang". The Austronesian languages of Asia and Madagascar. eds. K.A. Adelaar and N. Himmelmann, pp 397–428. New York: Routledge.
Kroeger, Paul R.  2010.  "The Grammar of hitting, breaking, and cutting in Kimaragang Dusun".  Oceanic Linguistics 49.1:1-20.
Kroeger, Paul.  2017.  "Frustration, culmination, and inertia in Kimaragang grammar".  Glossa:  a journal of general linguistics 2(1):56, 1-29.
Kuo, Jonathan Cheng-Chuen.  2015.  Argument Alternation and Argument Structure in Symmetrical Voice Languages:  A case study of transfer verbs in Amis, Puyuma, and Seediq.  PhD Dissertation:  University of Hawai’i at Mānoa.
Lee, Wei-Wei.  2016.  The Expression and Conceptualization of Time in Kavalan (Austronesian, Taiwan).  MA thesis:  Universiteit Leiden.
Li, Paul Jen-kuei.  2000.  "Some Aspects of Pazeh Syntax".  Oceanic Linguistics Special Publications 29:89-108.
Li, Paul Jen-kuei.  2002.  "Nominalization in Pazih".  Language and Linguistics 3.2:227-239.
Liu, (Adlay) Kun-Long.  2017.  Syntactic Interactions with Information Structure in Squliq Atayal.  PhD dissertation:  Australian National University.
 
Liu, Dorinda Tsai-hsiu.  2014.  "Neutral and Imperfective Forms in Kanakanavu".  Argument realisations and related constructions in Austronesian languages: papers from 12-ICAL, Volume 2. eds. I.W. Arka and N.L.K.M. Indrawati, pp 175-195.  Asia-Pacific Linguistics 013 / Studies on Austronesian languages 002.  Canberra:  Australian National University.  
McKaughan, Howard.  1962.  "Overt Relation Markers in Maranao".  Language 38.1:47-51.
McKaughan, H.  1970.  "Topicalization in Maranao - an addendum".   Pacific linguistic studies in honour of Arthur Capell.  eds. S.A. Wurm, and D.C. Laycock, pp 291-300. Pacific Linguistics C-13.  Canberra: Australian National University.
Mirikitani, Leatrice T. 1972. Kapampangan Syntax.  Oceanic Linguistics Special Publication, 10.  Honolulu: University of Hawai’i Press. 
Pan, Chia-jung.  2012.  A Grammar of Lha’alua, an Austronesian Language of Taiwan.  PhD dissertation:  James Cook University.
Pearson, Matt.  2005.  "Voice morphology, case, and argument structure in Malagasy".  Proceedings of AFLA 11.  ed. P. Law, pp 229-243.  Zentrum für Allgemeine Sprachwissenschaft, Berlin.
Prentice, D.J.  1965.  "Form and Function in the Verbs of Sabah Murut:  A Preliminary Analysis".  Oceanic Linguistics 4.1/2:127-156.
Reid, Lawrence Andrew.  1966.  An Ivatan Syntax.  PhD dissertation:  University of Hawai'i.
Ross, Malcolm.  2002.  "The history and transitivity of western Austronesian voice and voice-marking".  The history and typology of western Austronesian voice systems.  eds.  Fay Wouk and Malcolm Ross, pp 17-62.  Pacific Linguistics 518.  Canberra:  Australian National University.
Ross, Malcolm and Stacy Fang-ching Teng.  2005. "Formosan Languages and Linguistic Typology".  Language and Linguistics 6.4:739-781.
Schachter, Paul and Fé T. Otanes. 1972. Tagalog Reference Grammar. Berkeley: University of California Press.
Shiohara, Asako.  2012.  "Applicatives in Standard Indonesian".  Objectivization and Subjectivization: A Typology of Voice Systems. eds. W. Nakamura and R. Kikusawa, pp 59-76.  Senri Ethnological Studies 77. Osaka: National Museum of Ethnology.
Sneddon, J.N.  1970.  "The languages of Minahasa, North Celebes".  Oceanic Linguistics 9:11-36.
Sneddon, J.N. 1975.  Tondano phonology and grammar.  Pacific Linguistics B-38.  Canberra:  Australian National University.
Travis, Lisa.  2010.  Inner Aspect:  the articulation of VP.  Dordrecht:  Springer.
Tryon, Darrell T.  1994.  "The Austronesian Languages".  Comparative Austronesian dictionary:  An introduction to Austronesian studies.  ed. D.T. Tryon, pp 5-45.  Berlin; New York:  Mouton de Gruyter.
Tsukida, Naomi.  2012.  "Goal Voice and Conveyance Voice of Seediq". Objectivization and Subjectivization: A Typology of Voice Systems. eds. W. Nakamura and R. Kikusawa, pp 77-95.  Senri Ethnological Studies 77. Osaka: National Museum of Ethnology.
van Urk, Coppe.  2015.  A uniform syntax for phrasal movement:  A case study of Dinka Bor.  PhD dissertation:  Massachusetts Institute of Technology.
Zeitoun, Elizabeth.  2005.  "Tsou". The Austronesian languages of Asia and Madagascar. eds. K.A. Adelaar and N. Himmelmann, pp 259-290. New York: Routledge.

Linguistic typology
Austronesian languages
Transitivity and valency